The 2010–2011 season was the 15th edition of the Lebanese Basketball League. The regular season began on Thursday, October 28, 2010 and ended on Wednesday April 13, 2012. The playoffs began on Sunday, April 17 and ended with the 2011 Finals on Sunday May 8, 2011, after Riyadi Beirut defeated Champville SC in 3 games to win their eight title (new format).

Teams

Preseason

Supercup 
Champville SC, winners of the Lebanese Basketball Cup defeated Riyadi Beirut, winners of the Lebanese Basketball League 2009–2010 to win The SuperCup.

Regular season

Standings

 teams highlighted in green means qualified for the final 4

Playoffs

Statistics Leaders

Awards 
 Player of the Year: Nathanel Johnson, Riyadi Beirut
 Guard of the Year: Austin Johnson, Mouttahed Tripoli
 Forward of the Year: Nathanel Johnson, Riyadi Beirut
 Center of the Year: Loren Woods, Riyadi Beirut
 Newcomer of the Year: Charles Tabet, Anibal Zahle
 Import of the Year: Nathanel Johnson, Riyadi Beirut
 Domestic Player of the Year: Fadi El Khatib, Champville SC
 Defensive Player of the Year: Darnell Cox, Champville SC
 Turning Point Player of the Year: Ismail Ahmad, Riyadi Beirut 
 First Team:
 G: Ali Mahmoud, Riyadi Beirut
 F: Nathanel Johnson, Riyadi Beirut
 F: Fadi El Khatib, Champville SC
 F: Terrence Shannon, Anibal Zahle
 C: Loren Woods, Riyadi Beirut
 Second Team:
 G: Rodrigue Akl, Anibal Zahle
 G: Austin Johnson, Mouttahed Tripoli
 G: Jasmon Youngblood, Champville SC
 F: Calvin Warner, Byblos Club
 C: Darnell Cox, Champville SC

References 

Lebanese Basketball League seasons
League
Lebanese